Aleksandr Aleksandrovich Bednov (29 August 1969 – 1 January 2015) was a former Soviet and Ukrainian militsiya officer and  rebel commander of the self-proclaimed Luhansk People's Republic in Ukraine. He was the leader of the pro-Russian Batman Rapid Response Group. He was assassinated in Luhansk, with a debate among his supporters on who was responsible although on the day of his killing LPR "prosecutor's office" issued an official statement confirming "liquidation" of Bednov as "a head of a criminal organization".

Death
Bednov commanded the Rapid Response Group "Batman" (also known as the Batman Battalion) until he was killed in an attack on his convoy on 1 January 2015. LPR "prosecutor's office" described the attack as an "arrest attempt" in relation to a criminal investigation  against Bednov started on 30 Demember 2014.

Members of the group said that the attack was ordered by head of the Luhansk People's Republic (LPR) Igor Plotnitsky. According to them, Bednov and his fighters were shot and killed "by order of Plotnitsky" because he was "ordered to sweep all intransigent commanders." Following this attack, the LPR arrested some of Bednov's men, and dissolved the battalion. Some of its personnel were dispersed into other LPR units, while Donetsk People's Republic field commanders Givi and Motorola invited former members to join their battalions.

After Bednov's assassination, Igor Girkin criticized the killing as a "murder" and "gangster ambush", and suggested that other commanders seriously consider leaving Donbas to Russia, as he did.

Notes

References

External links

1969 births
2015 deaths
Ukrainian militsiya officers
Male murder victims
People from Luhansk
People murdered in Ukraine
People of Anti-Maidan
People of the Luhansk People's Republic
Pro-Russian people of the 2014 pro-Russian unrest in Ukraine
Pro-Russian people of the war in Donbas
Russian military personnel of the war in Donbas
Unsolved murders in Ukraine
Deaths by firearm in Ukraine
Military personnel killed in war in Donbas
Ukrainian collaborators with Russia
2015 murders in Ukraine